Bréhat is an island and commune located near Paimpol, a mile off the northern coast of Brittany. Administratively, it is a commune in the Côtes-d'Armor department in northwestern France.

Bréhat is actually an archipelago composed of two main islands, separated only at high tide, and many smaller ones. It is famous for its pink granite rocks, very mild micro-climate and Mediterranean vegetation, due to the warm Gulf Stream coming from across the Atlantic.

Many day-trippers come to Bréhat every day by the ferry service (les Vedettes de Bréhat) and visit the main tourist attractions, the Paon and Rosedo lighthouses, the St-Michel chapel, the Guerzido beach, the Birlot water-mill and the Verrerie of Bréhat.

Climate 
Bréhat features a temperate oceanic climate with mild winters, dry summers and lower precipitation levels than continental Brittany as a result of the effects of the Gulf Stream, favoring a wide diversity of plants and flowers such as mimosas, hortensias, ceanothus, echiums and agapanthus. It is one of the few places in Brittany and its surroundings where palm trees and other Mediterranean plants can grow naturally due to the scarcity of frosts throughout the year.

Population 
Inhabitants of Île-de-Bréhat are called Bréhatins in French.

Sights 
Héaux de Bréhat Lighthouse
Rosedo Lighthouse
Chapelle Saint Michel
Paon Lighthouse
Chapelle Keranroux
Verrerie of Brehat

People linked to Île-de-Bréhat 
Pierre-Marie Le Bozec- Naval officer who lived and died here
André César Vermare (1869–1949), renowned sculptor who resided and died in the island
Marc Chagall (1887–1985), painted La fenêtre sur l'Ile de Bréhat, 1924, kept at Vereinigung Zürcher Kunstfreunde.
Goudji (born 1941), the Georgian-born French sculptor and goldsmith, frequently resides in Bréhat; in 2008 he offered an item and participated in an auction to restore local religious monuments

See also 
Communes of the Côtes-d'Armor department

References

External links 

Mairie de Bréhat (Island town home)
Vedettes de Bréhat (ferry boat company)
Tourism in Brehat

Brehat
Communes of Côtes-d'Armor